Lee Hong-Koo (born May 9, 1934; Hangul: 이홍구; Hanja: 李洪九) is a former Korean academic, politician, and think tank leader who served as a former Prime Minister of the Republic of Korea, former South Korean Ambassador to the United Kingdom and United States, and founding Chairman of the East Asia Institute in Seoul.

Early life and education
Lee Hong-Koo's family name ("bon-gwan") originates with the Jeonju Lee clan (or Jeonju Yi clan), the family of the ruling dynasty of Korea from 1392 to 1910. He is the 15th generation descendant of Yi Jeon, Prince Yeongsan who is the son of King Seongjong of Joseon. He was born in what was then the (village-designated) Yeoyu-ri, Koyang District, Gyeonggi Province (today a part of Yeouido Island, Seoul), in Japanese Korea. Raised in Japanese Gyeongseong (Seoul), in 1953, he graduated from the elite Gyeonggi High School. The same year, he entered Seoul National University to study law but dropped out the following year.

Academic career

In the United States
In 1955, Lee entered Emory University in the United States majoring in political science, and graduated in 1959. Later he earned MA (1961) and PhD (1968) degrees in political science from Yale University. He was an adjunct professor at Emory University from 1964 until 1968. In 1973–1974, he returned again to the United States, first as a fellow at Woodrow Wilson International Center (think tank) in 1973, and then at Harvard Law School in 1974.

Lee was awarded an honorary doctorate by Emory University in 1978.

In Seoul
In 1968 or 1969, Lee returned to Korea to serve as professor of political science at Korea's top university, Seoul National University through 1973, and again served in this capacity after his return from Harvard circa 1974. He served as professor at SNU until his appointment as a government minister in 1988.

Political career
Following 33 years in academia (around half in the U.S. and half in Seoul), Lee Hong-Koo entered the world of politics and government when in 1988, he was appointed unification minister by newly elected President Roh Tae-Woo.

In 1991, Lee was appointed South Korean Ambassador to the United Kingdom, also by Roh, and from 1994-95 Lee served as the 28th Prime Minister of the Republic of Korea under President Kim Young-Sam (though as Korea is a strong presidential system, the position of Prime Minister is subordinate to the presidency). At this time, Lee was not a member of any party.

Entrance into the New Korea Party
In 1996, upon the advice of (then-)President Kim Young-Sam, Lee Hong-Koo formally entered the New Korea Party to run as a candidate for that party in the then-upcoming National Assembly elections.

The New Korea Party was a rebranded version of the coalition of conservative and moderate forces that had come together in 1990 with the mergers of Kim Young-Sam's centrist party (core support area: Pusan and South Kyongsang), Kim Jong-Pil's  (core support area: Chungcheong), and Roh Tae-Woo’s conservative party (core support area: Taegu and North Kyongsang), the latter of which was the clearest successor to the military-oriented regimes of the 1960s to 1980s. The party’s rebranding as ‘New Korea’ came following the departure of Kim Jong-Pil's party from this coalition in 1995. (The New Korea Party was renamed the Grand National Party in 1998 and essentially endured through the mid 2010s, with Kim Jong-Pil and his followers also returning by 2006, until the political crisis of 2016 under Park Geun-Hye caused severe divisions that broke apart the successor Saenuri party.)

Lee Hong-Koo was elected a member of the National Assembly in the April 1996 general election, as the second name on the national party list for the New Korea Party. As Korea then had 47 seats to distribute on a proportional basis at the time, the high slot that the party gave Lee guaranteed that he would enter the National Assembly. The New Korea Party itself won 139 of 299 seats in the election, far above its rivals' individual totals of 79 seats (Kim Dae-Jung's party) and 50 seats (Kim Jong-Pil's right-wing breakaway party).

Rapid political rise, presidential speculation
Lee rose quickly in 1996, becoming a member of the Executive Committee of the New Korea party, and then the leader of the party itself. Lee was, at this time, widely considered a possible successor to President Kim Young-Sam (whose term of office was February 1993 to February 1998).

In 1995 and early 1996, Lee served as chairman of the World Cup Bidding Committee, which successfully lobbied for South Korea to co-host the World Cup in 2002 (FIFA selected Korea/Japan in May 1996).

In December 1996, after the government quickly forced through a revised labor law despite widespread opposition across the country, Lee Hong-Koo resigned from his top leadership position in the New Korea Party but remained in the party.

Following the inset of the 1997 Asian economic crisis, the opposition National Congress for New Politics candidate Kim Dae-Jung won the presidential election in December 1997 and took office in February 1998, Lee Hong-Koo was still a sitting National Assembly member from the party, now rebranded the Grand National Party (as of November 1997).

Ambassador to the United States
On March 24, 1998, President Kim Dae-Jung nominated Lee Hong-Koo to be South Korean Ambassador to the United States. As Lee Hong-Koo was serving in a top advisory capacity for the Grand National Party, the decision to appoint him ambassador to the U.S. was seen to signal a change in the nature of Korean politics. The Foreign Ministry explained that the nomination of a relatively important official of the previous government “shows our intention to pursue bipartisan foreign policy.” The concurrent nomination of Lee Sung-Soo as Unification Minister, also a former prime minister under the previous government, was seen to confirm this attitude.

Lee Hong-Koo served as the South Korean Ambassador to the United States for two and a half years, from May 1998 through August 2000, when he was replaced by Yang Sung-chul (serving August 2000 to April 2003). Lee's tenure as ambassador was during the "Sunshine Policy", when apparently-improving inter-Korean relations led President Kim Dae-Jung to become a serious contender for the Nobel Peace Prize, which he won in October 2000.

Post-politics career
Lee Hong-Koo was actively involved in government and diplomacy for 12 years (1988 to 2000) and active electoral politics in the National Assembly for two years (1996–1998). Following his return to private life in 2000, Lee became active as a newspaper columnist and in the think tank and policy world, becoming a member, among other organizations, of the elite Club of Madrid of former heads of state and government, and as a board member of the Seoul Forum, and founded a think tank himself (EAI).

Founding the 'East Asia Institute' think tank
In May 2002, Lee Hong-Koo founded the East Asia Institute (generally called "EAI" after its English acronym. Korean name: 동아시아연구원) as an independent, non-profit, political- and foreign-policy think tank based in Seoul. By the 2010s, EAI consistently ranks in “the top 100 think tanks" among 6,000 think tanks around the world and its research and institutional model has been benchmarked by nascent research institutions in developing countries.

Lee Hong-Koo served as the Chairman of the Board at EAI for exactly ten years, retiring from the post in May 2012, the same month as his 78th birthday. Ha Young-Sun took over as chairman following Lee's retirement, a position he retains as of 2017.

Journalism and journalistic 'stalking' case
 
Lee wrote articles for the JoongAng Ilbo newspaper over several years.

In 2011, the left-wing academic Chin Jung-kwon caused a small sensation by apparently "stalking" Lee by posting his own articles in Hankyoreh, a progressive South Korean daily, on the same day as Lee's columns were posted. Chin's "stalking" started precisely on April 11, 2011. He followed Lee's columns for 10 consecutive postings up to October 14, 2011. Chin's columns were posted about 20 hours later on the same day as Lee's columns were posted. Their columns are listed below.

Lee Hong-koo usually wrote columns once every three weeks, but he took four weeks before writing a new column on October 3. Chin still followed him on October 3, so it was clear that Chin "stalked" Lee intentionally. Chin's columns no longer get published after this incident. Chin's purpose of stalking has not been verified, but Chin was accused by someone in his Twitter for suspected computer hacking and queer sexual identity.

References

External links
 Lee Hong-koo Naver Profile 

Living people
1934 births
Prime Ministers of South Korea
Academic staff of Seoul National University
Seoul National University alumni
Jeonju Yi clan
Ambassadors of South Korea to the United States
Ambassadors of South Korea to the United Kingdom
Emory University alumni
Yale University alumni